Cold Trail is a 2006 Icelandic film directed by Birni Brynjúlfi Björnssyni. The film was nominated for five Edda Awards, winning for best Sound & Music and best Visual Design.

Cast 
 Þröstur Leó Gunnarsson - Baldur Maríusson
 Elva Ósk Ólafsdóttir - Freyja
 Helgi Björnsson - Karl
 Hjalti Rögnvaldsson - Péter
 Tómas Lemarquis - Siggi
 Lilja Guðrún Þorvaldsdóttir - Ásta
 Anita Briem - Elín
 Harald G. Haraldsson - Tóti

References

External links
 
Entry on icelandicfilms

2006 films
Icelandic thriller films
2006 thriller films
2000s Icelandic-language films